Giorgio Guazzaloca (6 February 1944 – 26 April 2017) was an Italian politician, Mayor of Bologna from 1999 to 2004.

Biography 
Guazzaloca left school when he was 14 and started working in his father's butcher's shop, opening one of his own in 1965.

From 1985 to 1999, Guazzaloca has been the president of the Italian General Confederation of Enterprises office of Bologna, and has been, from 1991 to 1998, president of the Chamber of Commerce, Industry, Agriculture and Artisanship.

Mayor of Bologna 
On 19 December 1998, Guazzaloca announced his intention to run for the office of Mayor of Bologna as a centre-right independent candidate, receiving support from the Pole for Freedoms coalition. Surprisingly, in June 1999, Guazzaloca won the runoff against the Olive Tree candidate and became the first right-wing Mayor of Bologna since the end of World War II. He declared that he wanted a city guided not on the basis of political ideologies but exclusively on the basis of the interests of the people of Bologna.

Guazzaloca tried to run for a second term in 2004, but he is defeated in the first round by the Union candidate Sergio Cofferati.

Later life and death 
In 2005, Guazzaloca became a member of the Italian Competition Authority.

Guazzaloca tried one more time to run for the office of Mayor of Bologna in 2009 with his own civic list, ranking third.

He died in the Sant’Orsola-Malpighi Polyclinic in Bologna on 26 April 2017, at the age of 73, after having fought for years against a multiple myeloma.

References 

1944 births
2017 deaths
20th-century Italian politicians
21st-century Italian politicians
Mayors of Bologna
Deaths from cancer in Emilia-Romagna
Deaths from multiple myeloma